The voiced velar lateral fricative is a very rare speech sound that can be found in Archi, a Northeast Caucasian language of Dagestan, in which it is clearly a fricative, although further forward than velars in most languages, and might better be called prevelar. Archi also has various voiceless fricatives and voiceless and ejective affricates at the same place of articulation.

The IPA has no dedicated symbol for this sound, but it can be transcribed as a raised velar lateral approximant, .

Features
Features of the voiced velar lateral fricative:

References

Lateral consonants
Pulmonic consonants
Voiced oral consonants
Velar consonants